Vietnamese Revolutionary Youth League (Chữ Nôm: 越南青年革命同志会), or Thanh Niên for short, was founded by Nguyen Ai Quoc (best known as Ho Chi Minh) in Guangzhou in the spring of 1925. It is considered as the “first truly Marxist organization in Indochina” and “the beginning of Vietnamese Communism”. With the support of Chinese Communist Party and the Kuomintang Left, during the period of 1925-1927, the League managed to educate and train a considerable number of Marxist-Leninist revolutionaries, preparing the prominent leadership for the Communist Party of Vietnam and the Vietnamese Revolution. At the time, Vietnam was part of colonial French Indochina.

The History of Vietnamese Revolutionary Youth League

Foundation

In December 1924, after the Fifth Congress of the Communist International in Moscow, Nguyen Ai Quoc left for Guangzhou as an interpreter of Mikhail Borodin (the alias of Mikhail Gruzenberg). With a Chinese pseudonym “Ly Thuy”, he was in fact mandated to promote communist movements in Indochina as well as in the rest of Southeast Asia.

Soon after Nguyen Ai Quoc's arrival, he began to contact Vietnamese exile groups in several southern Chinese cities from late 1924 to early 1925. In 1925, Nguyen Ai Quoc, with 9 most trustworthy members of Tam Tam Xa (the Society of Like Hearts; Chinese: 心心社), established a secret organization, the Communist Youth Corps (Thanh Nien Cong San Doan). The rest of Tam Tam Xa would plan to be absorbed into a larger, public and mass-oriented organization, i.e. the Vietnamese Revolutionary Youth League, with the Communist Youth Corps as its nucleus.

On 21 June 1925, Thanh Nien was formally established by Nguyen Ai Quoc and some former leading members of Tam Tam Xa. The headquarters of the League was located in a rented three-storey house on 13 Wen Ming Street, in downtown Guangzhou. During 1925-1927, the Guangzhou headquarters operated as the Central Committee and the directing center for their underground revolutionary movements in Vietnam. At the same time, the leaders of Thanh Nien also organized 3 sessions of “Special Political Training Class”, teaching revolutionary theory and practices (history and language courses were also included in the curriculum). Nguyen Ai Quoc, Ho Tung Mau and Le Hong Son gave lectures to their recruits, and they would also invite some Chinese Communist Party (CCP) members, Kuomintang (KMT) Leftists and Comintern officials as guest lecturers. Each training session would last about 3 to 4 months. After finishing their training, most of the recruits were sent back to Vietnam to recruit new members and organize underground anticolonial movements. Some recruits participated in CCP and sequent revolutionary movements in China. Outstanding members, like Le Hong Phong, Le Quang Dat, and Tran Phu, were even sent to Whampoa Military Academy or the University for the Toilers of the East (Soviet Union) for further military and political training.

To propagandize their revolutionary ideas and attract young people, the League published pamphlets and periodicals (in Vietnamese) on different political subjects. The Road to Revolution (Duong Kach Menh), a training manual for the League's members, was a collection of Nguyen Ai Quoc's lecture notes for the training course. This pamphlet was published by the propaganda sector of the League of Oppressed Peoples in 1927. Four periodicals were published regularly during the League's lifetime: 208 issues of weekly Thanh Nien (Youth) from June 1925 to May 1930; the weekly Bao Cong Nong (Worker-Peasant) from December 1926 to early 1928; the biweekly Linh Kach Menh (Revolutionary Soldier) from early 1927 to early 1928; and 4 issues of the monthly Viet Nam Tien Phong (Vanguard of Vietnam) in 1927.

Growth of Thanh Nien

The League expanded quite slowly in 1925, and picked up momentum only with the student strikes. They began their recruitments by setting recruiting points in ports and on the Chinese border. Some of the early members were children adopted by former members of Tam Tam Xa, like Ly Phong Duc, Ly Tri Thong and Ly Ung Tuan, who were brought to Guangzhou from Siam in 1920 by Le Hong Son and Ho Tung Mau. New recruits would be brought to Pham Hong Thai’s tomb, to pledge their loyalty to the League, although the League discouraged his terrorist tactics. In September 1926, Nguyen Luong Bang, one of the earliest Thanh Nien recruits, volunteered to return Vietnam to recruit new members. With Nguyen Ai Quoc's instructions, he attempted to look for friends and relatives in his home village or in the city and led them to multi-help associations or fraternal associations. He tried to bring up the subject of colonial oppression and the importance of unity in his conversation to the potential participants of the League. Most active people were recruited and expected to bring more adherents. Young Vietnamese who managed to escape arrest arrived in Guangzhou through Hong Kong in groups of ten or twenty. Many of them were students expelled from school because of joining strikes or made restless by the political ferment. The Lycée Albert Sarraut in Hanoi and the Franco-Annamite school of Nam Dinh were two most fertile recruiting grounds, for many recruits were from these two schools.

In 1927, recruitment into the League was at its peak, for young Vietnamese were extremely disaffected by the French authorities after the death of Phan Chu Trinh and the arrest of Nguyen An Ninh in March 1926. Many students from Cochinchina participated in the League, meeting up with their peers from Tonkin and Annam in Guangzhou. In March 1927, the fourth wave of trainees was gathering in Guangzhou; but unfortunately, Chiang Kai-shek’s April 12 coup and his sequent persecution of communists crushed their training. Nguyen Ai Quoc fled to Moscow in June 1927. Main leaders like Ho Tung Mau and Le Hong Son were imprisoned. To escape KMT’s repression, the headquarters of the Revolutionary Youth League had to be moved to Wuhan and later to Hong Kong (Kowloon). Despite the radical political transition in Guangzhou (the breakup of CCP-KMT United Front), the League managed to continue some of its activities and military training in Guangzhou until the end of 1928.

Split and Dissolution

In Vietnam, Thanh Nien’s propaganda and recruitment gained great success. Three regional committees (Kybo) were set up for Tonkin, Annam, and Cochichina by mid-1928: in February 1928, the Committee designated Vuong Thuc Oanh, Nguyen Thieu and Nguyen Si Sach to be the leaders of the Annam Regional Committee. Four months later, Le Van Phat was named to lead the Cochinchina Regional Committee, together with Nguyen Kim Cuong and Chau Van Liem. And the Tonkin Regional Committee was established in July 1928, consisting of Duong Hac Dinh and Trinh Dinh Cuu. However, the explosive domestic expansion of Thanh Nien took place without strong guidance from the Central Committee in Guangzhou because of a series of KMT’s anti-communist repression in China. The lack of contacts with a unified headquarters indicates the sign of the factional split within the League.

At the end of September 1928, the Tonkin Regional Committee (or Bac Ky) is said to have a “Reorganization Conference” near Hanoi to discuss approaches to ‘proletarianize’ their group. As they recognized that the majority of the group was students and teachers, they wanted to gain more workers. Two cadres, Ngo Gia Tu and Nguyen Duc Canh, supervised the works to promote propaganda among miners and factory workers, and to ‘proletarianize’ petty bourgeois students and teachers by sending them to the countryside and urban factories. Members who could not adjust to the new demands were labeled as “spoiled” and “lacking in virtue”, and would be removed from the League. The Tonkin Regional Committee's action implies that they had lost confidence in the Central Committee. After the move of Guangzhou headquarters in 1928, the radical northern faction began to take instructions from the Comintern via the Communist Party of France.

In the beginning of May 1929, the League held a plenum in Hong Kong to vote on a new organizational structure and a new program of action, in order to meet Comintern requirements for a national branch. This Congress, attended by 17 delegates from each of the three main administrative districts of Vietnam, as well as Hong Kong and Siam, reveals a gap between the Central Committee and radical domestic members at the opening day of the meeting. The Tonkin and Annam delegates insisted on transforming the Youth League to a proper communist party by eschewing the concept of unitary revolution in favor of class struggle. Three delegates, Tran Van Cung, Nguyen Tuan and Ngo Gia Tu left the Congress early and later resigned from the League when Lam Duc Thu and Le Hong Son disapprove their immediate transformation of the League for the timing for forming a communist party hadn’t come yet. The Central Committee leaders were accused by radical dissidents of a “bourgeois group” and “false revolutionaries”.

On 17 June 1929, more than 20 delegates from cells throughout Tonkin held a conference in Hanoi, where they declared the dissolution of the Revolutionary Youth League and the establishment of a new organization called the Communist Party of Indochina (Dong Duong Cong San Dang. different from another Indochinese Communist Party founded in 1930, which were previously the Vietnamese Communist Party). In a few months, the Party managed to absorb most former Thanh Nien members in Tonkin Regional Committee and began to found branches in Annam and Cochinchina. The Party also led a series of worker's strikes in many areas from north to south, like Hanoi, Haiphong, Vinh, Danang and Saigon.

The growth of ICP threatened the rest of Thanh Nien leaders in Cochinchina Regional Committee (or Nam Ky), i.e. the moderate faction in the Thanh Nien. Thus, in the fall of 1929, with the support of the Central Committee in Hong Kong, the leaders of the southern committee decided to dissolve Thanh Nien and transform it to the Annam Communist Party (Annam Cong San Dang). The two former Thanh Nien factions, ICP, and Annam Communist Party were rivals for the leadership of the domestic revolutionary movements.

The Political Landscape of Guangzhou in the 1920s
Why Thanh Nien was able to be founded at this period in China? Why the founders of Thanh Nien chose Guangzhou rather than other cities? Few sources have discussed these questions in particular. Some books reveal a few fragments of the broad background, but are only treated as auxiliary information of Thanh Nien's history. And in most sources, the historical background of the foundation of Thanh Nien seem to be narrated in a way that Nguyen Ai Quoc's determination and efforts played the most important role in the foundation. Hence, their stories often start from Nguyen Ai Quoc's appearance in the Fifth Congress of Comintern, while what happened in Guangzhou before his arrival is hardly concerned. If we situate Thanh Nien, as well as Nguyen Ai Quoc and Tam Tam Xa in a broad context, i.e. the political landscape of Guangzhou, the establishment of Thanh Nien is not only the story of Vietnamese contact and practice of Communism, but also a consequence of the interactions between Soviet Union (USSR)/Cominten, KMT and CCP and the transformation of the political milieu of Guangzhou.

Vietnamese Exilic Revolutionaries in Guangzhou
Before Nguyen Ai Quoc's arrival, many Vietnamese activists had gathered in Guangzhou and organized anticolonial movements. Sharing with the same patriotic passion and resentment towards the French colonizers, these exilic revolutionaries and organizations prepared potential members for Thanh Nien.

Two organizations are studied most by scholars: Phan Boi Chau’s Restoration League (Viet Nam Quang Phuc Hoi) in the 1910s and Tam Tam Xa in the 1920s. Some of the Tam Tam Xa members, like Lam Duc Thu, had previously participated in Phan Boi Chau’s Restoration League. It was out of Tam Tam Xa, a small radical group of Vietnamese, that Thanh Nien was created. Founded in 1923, Tam Tam Xa was made of seven quasi-intellectuals, including Le Hong Son and Ho Tung Mau. Most of them were elementary-school teachers from the Nghe-Tinh region. The best-known event of Tam Tam Xa was Pham Hong Thai’s attempt to assassinate the French governor of Indochine, Martial Merlin, in 1924. Unfortunately, Thai’s mission failed and he drowned himself in a lake while escaping. Guangdong Revolutionary Government buried him next to the tomb of 72 martyrs who sacrificed in the Huang Hua Gang Uprising, in spite of French protests.

After contacting and talking to the existing anticolonial groups in Shanghai, Guangzhou and Wuhan between 1924 and 1925, especially members of Tam Tam Xa, Nguyen Ai Quoc reported to the Executive Committee of the Communist International (ECCI) that these anticolonial groups “know nothing about politics, and much less about organizing the masses.” Thus, instead of founding a formal communist party, Nguyen Ai Quoc decided to form a new organization based on Tam Tam Xa, as a nursery for educating and training young people, whose political ideas were still unformed despite their increasing dissatisfaction, to be committed Marxist-Leninist revolutionaries. In other words, the origin of Vietnamese Revolutionary Youth League can be traced back to Nguyen Ai Quoc's conversion of Tam Tam Xa to communism.

USSR Cooperation with KMT and CCP
Many sources have pointed out that Thanh Nien was established at the period when the CCP-KMT United Front was based in Guangzhou, which made Guangzhou a relatively ease environment for Nguyen Ai Quoc and Tam Tam Xa to form a communist organization. Actually, the CCP-KMT United Front is a direct consequence of USSR’s alliance with CCP and KMT, following a Comintern agent and KMT’s adviser, Borodin’s advice. In order to achieve their political goals within the political environment in China in the 1920s, all the three Parties had their own necessity to seek for cooperation with each other.

For CCP, founded in 1921 in Shanghai and joined Comintern in 1922, the Party was in its burgeoning period. Although CCP succeeded to organize many workers’ strikes and peasant movements in China and was able to mobilize large populace soon after its foundation, the Party was still very weak in power and reputation comparing to warlords and Sun Yat Sen’s KMT. Most importantly, at its early years, CCP didn’t have its own military power and weapons, thus it was suppressed by the French authority in Shanghai and the local warlords like Wu Peifu. Since Comintern and USSR provided guidance and strategies in organization and operation, they sought for a cooperator with military power, reputation, as well as the same necessity to fight against foreign imperialism and domestic feudal warlords.

For KMT, especially for Sun Yat Sen, although KMT was established in 1911 and ended the rule of monarchy in 1912, its operation and movements were disrupted frequently by Beiyang Government and other domestic warlords. After the failure of a series anti-feudal movements from 1913-1922, Sun fell into despair to the situation, and began to consider the possibility to cooperate with USSR and CCP, in order to expel feudal warlords and remove one of the biggest block in KMT’s development. After several conversations between Sun and USSR’s members, the cooperation of USSR and KMT began in 1923 . And following Borodin’s advice, KMT agreed to reorganize the Party and allowed CCP’s members to join KMT, which is called the policy of “allying with Russia and integrating the communist party” (Chinese: 联俄容共). In January 1924, the First KMT Congress in Guangzhou was marked by the formal establishment of the First CCP-KMT United Front.

For USSR and Comintern, they also sought for local cooperators to promote communist movement in China. Until the outbreak of the Russian revolution in 1917 that Marxism (or Communism) and the Bolsheviks had been little known outside the Western world. After the foundation of Comintern in 1919, Comintern agents fanned out eastwards to promote Communist movements and the cause of social revolution, which soon began to exert a significant impact on radical revolutionaries in China and Vietnam in the 1920s. The foundation of CCP is one of these achievements. However, because CCP was quite weak at that time, USSR preferred a more influential partner, like warlords or KMT, to promote their movement more effectively. After their proposal being refused by Wu Peifu, USSR turned to Sun Yat Sen and decided to ‘fully support KMT’ in Jan. 4, 1923, in exchange of Sun's promise of securing the Soviet Union's rights and profit in Mongolia and railways in Middle East. Maring and Joffe were in charge of changing Comintern's “Irkutsk line” to full cooperation with Sun Yat Sen. During 1923-1927, Soviet arms, financial support and military advice were provided by USSR to KMT via Borodin, the Comintern agent in Guangzhou. The Whampoa Military Academy, located in the countryside of Guangzhou, was also established under Borodin's guidance. When Nguyen Ai Quoc had arrived Guangzhou in the winter of 1924, the United Front was preparing for expelling warlord Chen Jiongming in East River district. And in March 1925, the newly trained and armed Whampoa student troops, succeeded to crush Chen's forces with the KMT Cantonese Army. This success consolidated the power of Guangdong Revolutionary Government and expanded its territory to the whole Guangdong Province, while CCP and its communist ideas also gained influence and popularity through this military activity. Although Sun Yat Sen died in March 1925, which was regarded as the loss of a great supporter to USSR and CCP, KMT rightists and CCP/USSR still managed to bury their conflicts in interest for the Northern Expedition. Therefore, in 1925, Guangzhou, as the base of Guangdong Revolutionary Government (the United Front) with the policy of cooperation with USSR and CCP, provided a relatively friendly environment for communist party and activities. On the other hand, Vietnamese revolutionaries in Guangzhou could also get assistance and shield from the Comintern agents and CCP.

In fact, the relationships between USSR, KMT and CCP not only offered the political possibility for Vietnamese revolutionaries to establish Thanh Nien, but also played a critical role in Thanh Nien's split. Chiang Kai-shek's April 12 coup and Wang Jingwei’s July 5 coup declared the breakup of the United Front and brought radical changes to the political environment in Guangzhou. As a result of KMT’s persecutions of communists, Thanh Nien was forced to leave Guangzhou and some important members either fled or were jailed by KMT government. This moving of headquarters left its regional committees in Vietnam operating without a unified headquarters, which inaugurated the factional split within Thanh Nien.

Support from China
The Revolutionary Youth League had a very humble beginning. Before the foundation of the League, the members of Tam Tam Xa were taken cared by a Zhou family in Xiguan, Guangzhou, whose host was over 60 years old. Being sympathetic to Vietnamese exilic activists, the old couple shared their house with the members of Tam Tam Xa and treated them as family members. In two letters of Nguyen Ai Quoc asking for Soviet Union’s help in early 1925, he mentioned that he had to use the $150 left over from his travel money from Moscow to bring the first bunch to Guangzhou. He complained that his salary (working for the ROSTA) was not enough to maintain his ‘students’, and his ‘financial situation will be hopeless’. However, the English sources (either written by Western or Vietnamese author) seldom mention, or only spend two or three sentences writing, how Thanh Nien managed to survive for several years in a foreign country, which was invaded by several colonial powers. According to Chinese communist accounts and some biographies of CCP members, the foundation and operation of Thanh Nien had obtained great support from Chinese Communist Party, Kuomintang Left, patriot merchants and even local people in Guangzhou. The rental of the headquarters and activity funds were largely paid by CCP, patriot merchants and ethnic Chinese in Vietnam. Some records even indicate that the new Canton Governor and the Party Representative of Whampoa Military Academy, Liao Zhongkai, also offered necessary assistance to the League. Members didn’t cook themselves, their meals were provided by the Peasant Movement Training Institute (PMTI), a training institute directed by CCP and KMT members aiming at peasant movements in southern China.

Besides economic support, CCP and KMT Left also assisted in training Vietnamese revolutionaries. Some CCP and KMT Left members (who were also trainers or officers in Whampoa Military Academy), like Zhou Enlai, Li Fuchun, Zhang Tailei, Peng Pai, Chen Yannian, etc., were invited to the “Special Political Training Class” to give lectures. Many of these guest lecturers were Nguyen Ai Quoc's friend when he was studied in France and Moscow. Ho Tung Mau often helped to interpret their lectures from Chinese to Vietnamese. Some recruits also joined the meetings and public speeches in the PMTI and Sun Yat Sen University. Moreover, the Whampoa Military Academy, the KMT school established by Mikhail Borodin and General Galen, had admitted and trained a large number of Vietnamese students sent by the League, many of whom continued their study in Moscow, became members of CCP or participated in Chinese military activities like the Northern Expedition, the Long March even the Anti-Japanese War (while the rest students were sent to Vietnam or Siam to recruit new adherents and organize revolutionary movements).

Furthermore, collaborating with Vietnamese revolutionaries, the Seamen's Union of CCP used to help to send pamphlets and periodicals (like Thanh Nien) to Vietnam, Siam and Laos, to promote the League's anticolonial movements in their home country as well as overseas Vietnamese communities in other Southeast Asian countries.

After April 1927, the League confronted a very difficult situation and was finally forced to move to Kowloon, because of the breakup of the CCP-KMT United Front and Chiang Kai-shek's persecution of communists. Even at that time, the Guangzhou Provincial Committee still tried to offer their support to solve their problems of living, and to restore the communications between the Comintern and the League's regional branches in Vietnam.

See also
 Hội Việt Nam Cách mạng Thanh niên (Vietnamese)
 Indochinese Communist Party (1929-1930)
 Annam Communist Party
 Indochinese Communist Party
 Communist Party of Vietnam
 Political organizations and Armed forces in Vietnam
 Nghe-Tinh Revolt
 CCP-KMT First United Front

Notes

References
 
 
 
 
 
 
 
 
 
 
 
 
 
 
 
 
 
 
 
 
 
 
 

Vietnamese communists
Defunct political parties in Vietnam
Communist parties in Vietnam
Ho Chi Minh
History of the Communist Party of Vietnam
Political parties established in 1925
Political parties disestablished in 1930
1925 establishments in French Indochina
1930 disestablishments in French Indochina
1925 establishments in Vietnam
1930 disestablishments in Vietnam
1920s in French Indochina
1920s in Vietnam